Verkhnerubezhny is a rural locality (a khutor) in Ilmenskoye Rural Settlement, Oktyabrsky District, Volgograd Oblast, Russia. The population was 243 as of 2010. There are 4 streets.

Geography 
Verkhnerubezhny is located on Yergeni, 67 km northwest of Oktyabrsky (the district's administrative centre) by road. Ilmen-Suvorovsky is the nearest rural locality.

References 

Rural localities in Oktyabrsky District, Volgograd Oblast